Arthur David LaVigne (January 26, 1885 – July 18, 1950) was an American Major League Baseball catcher who played for the Buffalo Buffeds in .

External links

1885 births
1950 deaths
Buffalo Buffeds players
Baseball players from Texas
Major League Baseball catchers
Worcester Busters players
New Haven Black Crows players
Brockton Shoemakers players
New Bedford Whalers (baseball) players
Lowell Tigers players
Lowell Grays players
Lynn Shoemakers players
Springfield Tips players
Lawrence Barristers players